Diarra Kilpatrick (born ) is an American actress. She is best known for acting on the ABC Digital series American Koko and HBO's Perry Mason. Kilpatrick also appeared in Private Practice, The Last O.G., and The Twilight Zone.

Early life and education 
Kilpatrick was born around 1983/84, and raised in Detroit. She is the half-sister of Kwame Kilpatrick.

She grew up performing in productions at Meadow Brook Theater. When she turned 12, she joined Mosaic Youth Theatre and starred in her first production. Kilpatrick graduated from Detroit Country Day and attended NYU Tisch for her bachelor's degree.

Career 
Kilpatrick moved to Los Angeles in 2007 and acted in local theater productions including Three Sisters After Chekhov, The Interlopers, and Tarell Alvin McCraney's In the Red and Brown Water.

In 2015, she wrote, produced, and starred in a satirical web series, American Koko, and launched it on YouTube. The series won the American Black Film Festival’s Best Web Series Award in 2015, after which it caught the attention of Julius Tennon, the husband of Viola Davis. The series was developed through their production company, JuVee Productions, and was purchased by ABC. The original first season was re-shot and a second season was also produced. Both seasons premiered online on ABC Digital on June 19, 2017. It follows Koko (played by Kilpatrick), who "is a Los Angeles race detective at the Everyone’s a Little Racist Agency, which has the daunting mandate of ending racism in America."

Kilpatrick wrote and starred in a pilot for Amazon Studios in fall 2017, The Climb.  It is a "Detroit-set comedy about an assistant who ditches her job to find internet fame." The series was not picked up by Amazon.

She appeared in The Twilight Zone reboot, and had supporting roles on Private Practice, The Last O.G., and HBO's Perry Mason.

Personal life 
Kilpatrick is married.

Awards and nominations 
 2011 – Nominee, Ovation Awards, Lead Actress in a Play (for The Interlopers)
 2013 – Nominee, Ovation Awards, Lead Actress in a Play (for In the Red and Brown Water)
 2018 – Nominee, Primetime Emmy Award for Outstanding Actress in a Short Form Comedy or Drama Series (for American Koko)

Filmography

Film

Television

References

External links 
 
 

Year of birth missing (living people)
Living people
21st-century American actresses
African-American actresses
African-American screenwriters
American producers
Actresses from Detroit
Tisch School of the Arts alumni
Detroit Country Day School alumni
African-American film producers
American stage actresses